Neelesh Misra (born 4 May 1973) is an Indian journalist, author, radio storyteller,  scriptwriter and lyricist. He is most known for his radio show, Yaadon Ka IdiotBox with Neelesh Misra on BIG FM 92.7. He is co-founder-editor of Gaon Connection, India's rural newspaper. He has also founded a content creation company called Content Project Pvt. Ltd. He is currently working on "The Neelesh Misra Show" on Red FM 93.5 and "Kahaani Express" on Saavn. He has recently launched two shows on the audio platform Audible and another show called Zindagi Mobile] on BIG FM 92.7 He is also popular for his show on YouTube - The Slow Interview, produced by Gaon Connection, where he chats with the celebs from Bollywood in the rural retreat near Lucknow district.

Early life and education
Brought up in Nainital, his father belonged to a village, Deora in Barabanki District, 42 km from Lucknow. His father Shiva Balak Misra, is a geologist in ONGC (Oil and Natural Gas Corporation) and writer. Later he founded a school in his village for kids.

Neelesh Misra did his schooling from boarding school, St. Joseph's College, Nainital (1988) and Mahanagar Boys' Inter College, Lucknow (1990). He did his graduation from Kumaun University, Nainital (1993), and later studied at Indian Institute of Mass Communication, Delhi, India.

Career
As a journalist, he has covered conflict and insurgency over the past two decades in South Asia, traveling deep into the hinterland. His travels have taken him from the rebel heartlands of Kashmir to Naxalite-dominated areas of central and eastern India, to the faraway north-east which is home to some of the world's longest-running insurgencies. He has closely studied the Maoist insurgency in Nepal. For his reportage from India's insurgency lands, he received the Ramnath Goenka Award for Excellence in Journalism and the K.C. Kulish Memorial Award in the year 2009. Presently he is the Editorial Director of his rural newspaper Gaon Connection.

He has written five books, including the well received The Absent State (2010), which he co-wrote with Rahul Pandita

Neelesh started his career as a Bollywood lyricist, when while researching for a book in Mumbai, he met director Mahesh Bhatt, which led to his debut song Jaadu Hai Nasha Hai for Jism (2003), this was followed by hit songs like Kya Mujhe Pyaar Hai for Woh Lamhe (2006), and went on write over 20 songs in over 15 films. In 2012, he co-wrote the screenplay for Salman Khan starrer, Ek Tha Tiger, along with film's director Kabir Khan.

He was the creative director, singer and songwriter in the India's first writer-led band, Band Called Nine, with singer Shilpa Rao and composer Amartya Rahut, working with traditional Indian craft of Qissa Goi (storytelling). The band was launched in 2010 at the annual Kala Ghoda Arts Festival in Mumbai. In 2011, the band released its debut album,  Rewind, consisting of songs and storytelling, put together with narrative recited by Misra.

He is also a blogger. His blog contains his experiences during his days as senior roving editor, his thoughts on various issues, and the poems he has written. He hosts a radio show, Yadoon Ka Idiotbox on BIG FM 92.7, set in fictitious small town,  Yaad Sheher, and which started its second season in 2012. He also hosts " The Neelash Mishra" show on 93.5 RED FM. In late 2012, he along with Karan Dalal, started a rural newspaper, Gaon Connection, based in Kunaura, a village near Lucknow.

Since Nov 2018, he hosts The Slow Interview With Neelesh Misra show on Youtube.

Books

Non-fiction 
 The Absent State (Hachette, 2010), a book on insurgency co-written. .
 173 Hours in Captivity, Harper Collins, 2000. .,
 End of the Line: The Story of the Killing of the Royals in Nepal. (Penguin, 2001). .

 Fiction 

 Once Upon a Timezone. Harper Collins, 2006. .
 Neelesh Misra ka Yaad Sheher Volumes-I and II.  (Westland Books). .Amazon.com – Neelesh Misra ka Yaad Sheher Volume-II

 As editor 
 India Yatra (Harper Collins, 2009, with a foreword by Nandan Nilekani)
 Inspired India: Ideas to Transform a Nation, Harper Collins, 2010, with a foreword by APJ Abdul Kalam. 
 Dream Chasing ,One Man's Remarkable True Life Story, a book by his father, Dr. S.B.Misra.(Roli Books, 2011,with a foreword by Sam Pitroda. .

Awards

 Ram Nath Goenka Award for Excellence in Journalism (under the category "Covering India Invisible", for a nine-part series on insurgency, titled "India Besieged")
 Karpoor Chandra Kulish Award (jointly with Pakistan's Dawn newspaper, for the series "The New Muslim")
 Karpoor Chandra Kulish Merit Award (for a nine-part series on insurgency, titled "India Besieged")
 Mirchi Music Award for Album of The Year at 3rd Mirchi Music Awards for Once Upon A Time In Mumbaai - Nominated
 Mirchi Music Award for Album of The Year at 4th Mirchi Music Awards for Bodyguard - Nominated
 Mirchi Music Award for Lyricist of The Year at 4th Mirchi Music Awards for "Teri Meri" from Bodyguard - Nominated
 Mirchi Music Award for Album of The Year at 10th Mirchi Music Awards for Jagga Jasoos - Nominated
 Mirchi Music Award for Listeners' Choice Album of the Year at 10th Mirchi Music Awards for Jagga JasoosPersonal life
Misra married Nidhi Razdan, a news anchor and editor, in 2005. The couple divorced in 2007. Misra is currently married to Yamini Misra, the couple had been blessed with a baby girl named Vaidehi Misra, as she also start to support in baby stories. Yamini also writes some stories for neelesh misra show.

Filmography
 Screenwriter
 Ek Tha Tiger (2012)
 Tiger Zinda Hai (2017)
 Shamshera (2022)
 Tiger 3 (2023)

Lyricist
 Jaadu Hai Nasha Hai – Jism (2003)
 Chalo Tumko Lekar Chalein – Jism (2003) 
 Bepanah Pyaar hai – Krishna Cottage (2004)
 Maine dil Se Kaha – Rog (2005)
 Khoobsoorat Hai Vo Itna – Rog (2005)
 Guzar Na Jaaye – Rog (2005)
 Kya Mujhe Pyaar Hai – Woh Lamhe (2006)
 Lamha Lamha – Gangster (2006)
 Khwahishon Se – Holiday (2006)
 Tu hai Bhatakta Jugnu Koi – Holiday (2006)
 Neele Neele Aasmaa Taley – Holiday (2006)
 Bolo Na Tum Zara – Fight Club – Members Only (2006)
 Gulon Mein Rang Bhare – Tribute to Faiz – Sikandar (2009)
 I am in love – Once Upon A Time in Mumbai (2010)
 Anjaana Anjaani ki Kahani – Anjaana Anjaani (2010)
 Abhi Kuch Dinon Se – Dil Toh Baccha Hai Ji (2011)
 Humko Pyaar Hua – Ready (2011)
 I Love You – Bodyguard (2011)
 Dil Mera Muft Ka – Agent Vinod (2012)
 Khudaaya – Shanghai (2012)
 Banjaara – Ek Tha Tiger (2012)
 Kyon – Barfi! (2012)
 Dhichkyaaon Doom Doom – Chashme Badoor (2013)
 Ishq Mohallah – Chashme Badoor (2013)
 Aala Re Aala - Shootout at Wadala (2013)
 Capuchino - I, Me Aur Main (2013)
 Zindagi (Reprise) – Bajrangi Bhaijaan (2015)
 Jhumritalaiyya-Jagga Jasoos (2017)
 Phire Faqeera - Pagglait (2021)
 Thode Kam Ajnabi - Pagglait'' (2021)

References

External links
 Neelesh Misra Official Website
 Neelesh Misra at Bollywood Hungama
 Neelesh Misra blog
 

 Hindi Blog

Living people
People from Nainital
Writers from Lucknow
Indian radio journalists
Hindi-language lyricists
Indian male songwriters
Indian storytellers
1973 births
Journalists from Uttarakhand